Jee's Harts Hill Granite and Brick Company's works railways consisted of a narrow gauge light railway and a standard gauge works railway at Hartshill station of the London and North Western Railway in England.

History 
Richard Gee (died 25 February 1853) founded Jee's Harts Hill Granite and Brick Company Limited in 1822 to quarry granite between Nuneaton and Polesworth and to manufacture building blocks at Chapeltown, on the outskirts of Nuneaton.

It was initially operated as a horse-drawn railway, and from 1908 onwards with a Hunslet Engine Company steam locomotive. The light railway was still in operation in 1947 with more than 15 wooden wagons.

A standard gauge siding connected to the London and North Western Railway; it was exactly 100 miles from Euston. Freight wagons were initially leased from the Birmingham Railway Carriage and Wagon Company. In 1899, the company purchased 24 wagons (Nos. 1 to 24) in two lots. The wagons were built with five planks and side doors, painted lime green and lettered diagonally in black from bottom left to top right and with the words "Harts Hill" at the top left and "nr. Atherstone" at the bottom right.

Industrial rail transport ceased in 1954, replaced by road transport.

References 

Rail transport in England
Nuneaton
2 ft 6½ in gauge railways
Standard gauge railways in England